Auto Raja is a 1982 Tamil-language film, directed by K. Vijayan. The film stars Vijayakanth and Jaishankar. It is a remake of the 1980 Kannada film of the same name with Gayatri reprising her role from the original. The film was released on 27 March 1982.

Plot

Cast 
 Vijayakanth as Raja
 Jaishankar as Ramu
 Gayatri as Rani / Bhavani
 Vanitha as Shanthi
 Sangili Murugan as Chellappa
 Thengai Srinivasan as Doctor
 V. K. Ramasamy as Servant
 Chithra as Raja's Sister
 T. K. S. Natarajan as Peon
 Kallapatti Singaram as Iyer
 Kaja Sheriff as Son of Kallapatti Singaram (Saambu)
 Bayilvan Ranganathan as Henchman

Soundtrack 
The soundtrack was composed by Shankar–Ganesh and Ilaiyaraaja composed one song. The lyrics for all songs were written by Pulamaipithan. Except "Sangathil Paadatha" which was composed by Ilaiyaraaja, rest of the songs were composed by Shankar–Ganesh.

Reception 
Kalki wrote .

References

External links 
 

1980s Tamil-language films
1982 films
Films directed by K. Vijayan
Films scored by Shankar–Ganesh
Tamil remakes of Kannada films